Martin Elechi is a Nigerian economist and politician. He served as the Governor of Ebonyi State from 2007 to 2015. He ran in the 2007 Nigerian general election on the People's Democratic Party (PDP) ticket and assumed the position on May 29, 2007, succeeding Sam Egwu.
Elechi ran successfully for re-election on 26 April 2011. In 2017 Elechi left People Democratic Party (PDP) for All Progressives Congress (APC).

See also 

 List of people from Ebonyi State
 List of state governors of Nigeria
 List of Governors of Ebonyi State

References

Living people
Governors of Ebonyi State
Nigerian Roman Catholics
Igbo people
Igbo politicians
Year of birth missing (living people)
Peoples Democratic Party state governors of Nigeria
People from Ebonyi State